Leucanopsis valentina is a moth of the family Erebidae. It was described by William Schaus in 1924. It is found in French Guiana.

References

valentina
Moths described in 1924